Oxyrrhis is a genus of dinoflagellates. It includes the species Oxyrrhis marina.

It is sometimes considered to be a monotypic genus. Some sources assign the species Oxyrrhis parasitica and O. phaeocysticola, as well.

Classification
Class Oxyrrhea Cavalier-Smith 1987 [Oxyrrhidophyceae; Oxyrrhia Cavalier-Smith & Chao 2004]
 Order Oxyrrhinida Cavalier-Smith 1993 [Oxyrrhinales Sournia 1984]
 Family Oxyrrhinidae [Oxyrrhinaceae Sournia 1984]
 Genus Oxyrrhis Dujardin 1841
 Species O. marina Dujardin 1841 [Oxyrrhis maritima van Meel 1969; Oxyrrhis tenticulifera Conrad 1939; Glyphidium marinum Fresenius 1865]
 Species O. parasitica Poche 1903

References

Dinoflagellate genera
Dinophyceae